Emmanuel K. Bartels known professionally as Pee GH or Pee On Da Beat, is a New Jersey-based Ghanaian record producer. He is best known for producing hit songs such as E.L's "Koko", "Abaa", "Agbo", "Overdose", "Higher";  Shatta Wale - "Am Ok", "Level"; D2 - "Wawane"; Weisa Greid - "One Side", "Ice Cream Man", Samini's "my own (co-produced)" and also for mixing and masterings Sarkodie's "Sub Zero".

Early life 
Born and raised in Obuasi in the Ashanti Region of Ghana, Pee GH decided on his career in music at a young age where he started making beats using buckets and drums and also recording cassette tapes with his little brother at home by recording music of other people while adding his own vocals to it. He graduated from the University of Ghana, Legon

Musical career 
Pee GH started making beats and recorded his first song at E.L's studio before moving to New Jersey, USA. PEE GH started to live his dream as a record producer for many star artistes in Ghana and beyond, guided by Grammy mastering engineer, Chris Gehringer.

He has been credited with engineering for BET Award winners Sarkodie and Stonebwoy. In 2016, he won the N.E.G.A Award as Producer Of The Year and was nominated in 2016 as Producer of the Year, at the Ghana Music Awards

Discography 

 Sarkodie - Fa Hooki Me
Sarkodie - Sub Zero (Mix & Mastering)
 E.L - Agbo
 E.L - Too Much Money
 E.L - Yaa School
 EL - Koko
 E.L feat. Joey B – Wosa
 EL – Overdose
 E.L – Collect Ft. Kwesi Arthur
 E.L – Higher
 E.L ft. Dope Nation – Ayeyi
 E.L ft Stonebwoy x Medikal – Dadado
 E.L. - Yaa Wor
 Pee GH ft Shatta Wale - Alright
 Pee Gh ft Shatta Wale x Wisa x Duke – Only U
 PEE Gh - Love ft Noelle
 PEE Gh ft Duke D2 - Die for you
 Shatta Wale - Am OK
 Shatta Wale - Level
 Shatta Wale - Gunshot
 Samini - my own
Stonebwoy - Come from far
 Akeju ft. Beenie Man - kiss and tell
Beenie Man - Everything Up ft. Stylo G, Seyi Shay 
 Wisa greid - Ice cream man
 Wisa Greid - One Side
Gasmilla - Speedometer
 Pam Official - Bobo
 Duke D2 ft Shatta Wale - Wawane
 Chase - Afia Pokuaa
 Kwaw Kese ft Duke(D2) - Aseda
 Duke(D2) ft Shatta Wale - Too Sweet
 Squadee ft Sarkodie, Bright (Buk Bak) - You Are Mine
 Duke(D2) ft Kwaw Kese – Wonche Adze
 PerryOfficial – Pay Day

Awards & Nominations

References 

1987 births
Living people
Ghanaian emigrants to the United States
Ghanaian record producers